Puerto Berrío is a municipality and town in the Colombian department of Antioquia.

Geography

Puerto Berrío is located in a region of Antioquia known as the Middle Magdalena (near the Magdalena River). It is bounded on the north by the municipalities of Yolombó, Remedios and Yondó, on the east by the department of Santander, on the south by the municipalities of Puerto Nare and Caracolí, and on the west by the municipalities of Caracolí and Maceo. It is some 191 km away from the city of Medellín, capital of Antioquia. The municipality has an extension of 1,184 km².

History
Puerto Berrio was founded in 1875 by Colombian General Ricardo Maria Giraldo. It became a municipality in 1881.

In 1801, Alexander von Humboldt drew up an official sketch of the place then known as Great Eddy in the region of the today Puerto Berrío. Later, the Cuban engineer Francisco Javier Cisneros, constructor of the Antioquia Railway, selected this same place to construct a port for the department of Antioquia by the Magdalena river, and also establish it as a railroad station.

In 1875, the government of Antioquia ordered by decree the official establishment of the town and named it after former governor of Antioquia and General of Colombia Pedro Justo Berrío. 
Since then Puerto Berrío's development has been tied to the railroad. When the railways extended to  Medellín in 1914 Puerto Berrio became an important port for shipments of products going over the Magdalena river, distributing Antioquia products to other main ports over the river and exports to through the Caribbean sea.

In 1925, a fire devastated all the population, with the exception of the facilities of the Railroad. The town went through a reconstruction process to quickly recover. Puerto Berrío became epicenter of the regional commerce and site forced for the transit of load, passengers and tourists. This although economic one lasted until 1963, when  Railroad of Antioquia  was nationalized. Due to intensification of the Colombian armed conflict the flow of the economy drastically decreased.

In 1991 in an effort to recover the government helped establish an association to recover the navigation. This  was created, with constitutional rank,  the Corporation of the Great river of the Magdalena,  in order to recover the navigability of the river.

Nowadays, it is an intermediate city of great commercial movement, and is considered the  capital of the Antioquian Mid-Magdalena, with a history related to Magdalena river and to  Railroad of Antioquia . Its condition of multimodal port, the possibility of connection with Medellín, Bogotá, department of Santander and  North Coast  by land, and their airport, has been determining in the development of the region. Majestic  Hotel Magdalena  recovered well like witness of more than 125 years of history, and attractive the natural exuberantes, are his more appraised tourist treasures to the date.

Economy
 Agriculture: Cacao, Maize, Banana, Yuca, Lemon 
 Cattle ranch: Milk and derivatives
 Mining of Gold  
 Logging
 Fishing  
 Informal commerce  
 Arts & Crafts: Atarrayas and Chichorros.

Celebrations
 Celebrations of the Return and Reign of Ecology, celebration emblem of the municipality 
 Celebrations of Virgin of the Carmen
 Festival of Cometa 
 Festival the Night of Poet s 
 Fiestas of Anniversary 
 Festival of Dance s and Música Folkloric.

Notable residents
Juan José Florián, para-cyclist and former paramilitary soldier

External links
 Tourist Antioquia, Puerto Berrío
 Municipal mayorship, Puerto Berrío

References

Municipalities of Antioquia Department